Hammenhögs IF is a sports club in Hammenhög, Sweden, established in 1927.

The women’s soccer team played four seasons in the Swedish top division between 1978–1981.

References

External links
Official website 

1927 establishments in Sweden
Football clubs in Skåne County
Sport in Skåne County
Association football clubs established in 1927